Syndendro is a village and a community of the Grevena municipality. Before the 2011 local government reform it was a part of the municipality of Grevena, of which it was a municipal district. The 2011 census recorded 194 residents in the village. The community of Syndendro covers an area of 19.229 km2.

According to the statistics of Vasil Kanchov ("Macedonia, Ethnography and Statistics"), 120Greek Christians,  and 150 Muslim Albanians lived in the village in 1900.

See also
 List of settlements in the Grevena regional unit

References

Populated places in Grevena (regional unit)
Villages in Greece